Natasha Halevi (born January 12, 1982) is an American actress and director based in Los Angeles, California. She is known for her role as Anaconda in Troma's B.C. Butcher, Cara in Lunch Break Feminist Club, and Alexis Shine in They Want Dick Dickster. Her directorial work can be found on Crypt TV, Midnight Pulp and Screambox. In 2022, she spearheaded Give Me An A an anthology feature film response to the overturning of Roe v. Wade.  She is also a director with Fatale Collective, creators of the horror anthology Fatale Collective: Bleed.

Early life and education 
Halevi was born in Ventura, California and attended St. Bonaventure High School. Halevi then studied at the University of California, Davis where she graduated with a Bachelor of Science degree in biology and a Bachelor of Arts in dramatic arts. While in college, she also guided for Outdoor Adventures as a rafting, sea kayaking and rock climbing guide.

Career 
Halevi lived in Boulder, Colorado during her early 20s, where she worked in sustainable design.

Acting
In 2014, she received her first feature film role in the dark comedy They Want Dick Dickster starring Robert Ray Shafer, Tim Russ, Tim Abell, and Richard Grieco. In the same year, she received a starring role in B.C. Butcher, directed by Kansas Bowling. In 2015, she played supporting roles in the feature films Toby Goes to Camp and Cop-Aholic.

Directing
Halevi is the director and part of the cast of Lunch Break Feminist Club which won "Best Ensemble Cast" at the Hollywood and Vine Film Festival on December 12, 2015.

In 2019, Halevi directed Beauty Juice starring Jennifer Holland, Tiffany Shepis and Krista Allen. This film won the Audience Choice Award at the Atlanta Horror Film Festival and went on to stream on Crypt TV, a prestigious horror distributor founded by Jack Davis and Eli Roth and backed by Jason Blum and Blumhouse Productions.

Halevi directed a segment of the anthology Fatale Collective: Bleed with Fatale Collective and is one of the original directors of the group of female horror directors. Fatale Collective members include Lola Blanc, Danin Jacquay, Francesca Maldonado, and Megan Rosati. Fatale Collective: Bleed premiered at FilmQuest in 2019 where it won the “Director’s Award for Cinematic Achievement”. The anthology also screened at Fantastic Fest, Overlook Film Festival and the Brooklyn Horror Film Festival.

Filmography
Film

Personal life
She married actor Sean Gunn in 2019.

References

External links 

Living people
American film actresses
University of California, Davis alumni
People from Ventura, California
1982 births
21st-century American women